The Church of All Saints is a  Grade I listed church in Upper Dean, Bedfordshire, England. It became a listed building on 13 July 1964.

The church escaped restoration in Victorian times and has a perfect country interior. The church was more or less rebuilt in the 15th century when only the tower and spire (14th-century) and the chancel arch (13th-century) were retained. The roofs are all 15th-century and fine specimens of that period. There are fine screens across the chancel arch and at the west ends of both chapels; the pews are old.

See also
Grade I listed buildings in Bedfordshire

References

Church of England church buildings in Bedfordshire
Grade I listed churches in Bedfordshire